Pete Sampras defeated Jim Courier in the final, 3–6, 7–6(7–5), 6–3, 6–4 to win the singles title at the 1991 ATP Tour World Championships. It was his first Tour Finals title.

Andre Agassi was the defending champion, but was defeated by Courier in the semifinals.

Draw

Finals

Ilie Năstase group
Standings are determined by: 1. number of wins; 2. number of matches; 3. in two-players-ties, head-to-head records; 4. in three-players-ties, percentage of sets won, or of games won; 5. steering-committee decision.

John Newcombe group
Standings are determined by: 1. number of wins; 2. number of matches; 3. in two-players-ties, head-to-head records; 4. in three-players-ties, percentage of sets won, or of games won; 5. steering-committee decision.

See also
 ATP World Tour Finals appearances

References
 ATP Tour World Championships draw

Singles
Tennis tournaments in Germany
1991 in German tennis
Sports competitions in Frankfurt